Keith Daniel Cumberpatch (25 August 1927 – 15 November 2013) was a New Zealand field hockey player. He represented New Zealand in field hockey in 1956 and 1958, including at the 1956 Olympic Games in Melbourne.

References

External links

1927 births
2013 deaths
Field hockey players from Christchurch
New Zealand male field hockey players
Olympic field hockey players of New Zealand
Field hockey players at the 1956 Summer Olympics